Bobby Sandimanie may refer to:

 I-20 (rapper), American rapper born 1975 and father of Destroy Lonely
 Destroy Lonely, American rapper 2001 and son of I-20